Alexandros Christofis or Alexandros Hristofis (Greek: Αλέξανδρος Χριστόφης, 1882-1953) was a Greek painter.

He was born in Piraeus in 1882.  He attended the School of Great Arts where he excelled with the studend Nikiforos Lytras.  He later went to Naples, where he attended the Institute of Great Arts.  From his journey until his death, he presented paintings with popular and teamwork positions.

From 1925, he was a professor of the technical school.  In his work, it depicts mainly its scenes of everyday life of its people either in outdoors or in the city and from the life of the Greek sailors at its ports in Piraeus.  Pictures are founded also in Germany.

His technique in which austerely judges academically with intense personal tone.

References
The first version of the article is translated and is based from the article at the Greek Wikipedia (el:Main Page)

1880s births
1953 deaths
Artists from Piraeus
20th-century Greek painters